East Richland Street-East Church Street Historic District is a national historic district located at Kershaw, Lancaster County, South Carolina.  It encompasses 28 contributing buildings in a residential section of Kershaw.   The majority of the residences date from about 1890 to 1920, a particularly significant period of development in Kershaw. The houses are in a variety of representative architectural styles include Victorian, Queen Anne, Colonial Revival, and Neo-Classical.

It was added to the National Register of Historic Places in 1990.

References

Houses on the National Register of Historic Places in South Carolina
Historic districts on the National Register of Historic Places in South Carolina
Victorian architecture in South Carolina
Colonial Revival architecture in South Carolina
Queen Anne architecture in South Carolina
Neoclassical architecture in South Carolina
Houses in Lancaster County, South Carolina
National Register of Historic Places in Lancaster County, South Carolina